Rotundichnus is an ichnogenus of dinosaur footprint. Rotundichnus muchehagensis dates to the early lower Cretaceous in central Laurasia (present-day Germany) and the largest footprint, that was 87 cm (2.85 ft) long, belongs to an individual that measured 21.5 meters (70.5 ft) and weighed 36.5 tonnes (40.2 short tons).

See also

 List of dinosaur ichnogenera

References

Dinosaur trace fossils
Sauropods